The American Music Awards for Favorite Female Artist – Pop/Rock has been awarded since 1974. Years reflect the year in which the awards were presented, for works released in the previous year (until 2003 onward when awards were handed out on November of the same year). The all-time winner in this category is Taylor Swift with seven wins. Mariah Carey is the most nominated female artist with 10 nominations.

Winners and nominees

1970s

1980s

1990s

2000s

2010s

2020s

Category facts

Multiple wins

 7 wins
 Taylor Swift
 4 wins
 Whitney Houston
 Olivia Newton-John

 3 wins
 Mariah Carey

 2 wins
 Paula Abdul
 Pat Benatar
 Sheryl Crow
 Celine Dion
 Lady Gaga
 Janet Jackson
 Katy Perry
 Linda Ronstadt

Multiple nominations

 10 nominations
 Mariah Carey

 8 nominations
 Taylor Swift

 7 nominations
 Whitney Houston

 6 nominations
 Celine Dion
 Janet Jackson
 Madonna
 Olivia Newton-John
 Linda Ronstadt

 5 nominations
 Lady Gaga
 Rihanna
 Barbra Streisand

 4 nominations
 Katy Perry
 Helen Reddy

 3 nominations
 Adele
 Ariana Grande
 Beyoncé
 Kelly Clarkson

 2 nominations
 Britney Spears
 Doja Cat
 Dua Lipa
 Pink

See also

 List of music awards honoring women

References

American Music Awards
Pop music awards
Rock music awards
Music awards honoring women
Awards established in 1974
1974 establishments in the United States